Associated Marine Insurers (Agents) Pty Ltd was an Australian marine insurance which for decades were jointly owned by insurers, Zurich Australia and CGU Insurance (an offshoot of Commercial Union) and founded in 1982. Zurich Australia took over full control of the business in 2004.

Its first managing director was Michael Hill.

By 2002, the marine insurance market was shrinking, particularly in Australia, due to both a decrease in the risks of shipping and in a fall in the number of Australian-registered ships.

It provides an example of a market failure. Following a change in CGU's ownership structure Zurich took over ownership of Associated Marine 100%.  That marked the downfall of Associated Marine, who found their strategy dictated by an insurer who was ignorant of the nuances of an specialist agency.

In its heyday, Associated Marine provided much needed specialist insurance to the Australian Marine market.  Today, the company has all but been absorbed into Zurich Australian operations and, following restructure upon restructure and many staff redundancies it is a shadow of its former self to the point where it is of very little significance in the market.

References

External link
Trademark registration

Insurance companies of Australia
Marine insurance companies